Cayma District is one of the twenty-nine districts of the Arequipa Province in Peru.

Arequipa is known as the birthplace of Adobo, the city's official dish. It also houses 17th century churches. It is the place were the Lozada family, one of Arequipa's most prestigious families and founders of the Arequipa Clinic, have lived since their arrival from Spain in the 1800s.

References

External links
  www.municayma.gob.pe Official district web site

Districts of the Arequipa Province
Districts of the Arequipa Region